Femke Markus (born 17 November 1996) is a Dutch professional racing cyclist. She is a younger sister of Riejanne Markus, but they are not related to Barry Markus and his sister Kelly Markus.

In 2023 Femke Markus and Mischa Bredewold will leave  and join team .

Major results

2022
 1st Leiedal Koerse
 3rd La Classique Morbihan
 3rd Dwars door het Hageland
 4th Omloop van Borsele
 8th Overall Belgium Tour
 Tour de France
Held  after Stages 1–2

References

External links
 

1996 births
Living people
Dutch female cyclists
Place of birth missing (living people)
People from Diemen
Cyclists from North Holland
21st-century Dutch women